Acantholipes tenuipoda is a species of moth in the family Erebidae. It is found in Taiwan.

References

tenuipoda
Moths described in 1920
Moths of Taiwan